The Man of Mystery is a 1917 American drama film directed by Frederick A. Thomson and starring E.H. Sothern, Charlotte Ives and Gilda Varesi Archibald.

Cast
 E.H. Sothern as David Angelo
 Charlotte Ives as Clara Angelo
 Gilda Varesi Archibald as Mme. Brunschaut 
 Mr. Roberts as Baron Rocco
 Brinsley Shaw as Pietro Stroggi
 Bernard Siegel as Signor Casa

References

Bibliography
 John T. Soister, Henry Nicolella & Steve Joyce. American Silent Horror, Science Fiction and Fantasy Feature Films, 1913-1929. McFarland, 2014.

External links
 

1917 films
1917 drama films
1910s English-language films
American silent feature films
Silent American drama films
American black-and-white films
Vitagraph Studios films
Films directed by Frederick A. Thomson
1910s American films